Yoke's Fresh Market is an employee-owned Spokane, Washington-based chain of grocery stores founded in 1946 by Marshall and Harriet Yoke.  The chain was established by their son Chuck in the 1960s and now encompasses 17 stores in Washington and Idaho, primarily in the Spokane area. In 1990, Chuck sold the chain to the employees.  John Bole currently directs company operations. In recent years, the chain has expanded into the southeastern portion of Washington, with stores in Pasco, Kennewick,  West Richland, and  Richland. 

The Liberty Lake Yoke's opened their doors on March 2, 2016, at the old Safeway/Haggen location.

In September 2016, Yoke's Fresh Market expanded their stores total to 17 by acquiring Trading Company Stores locations in Cheney, Latah Creek (South Spokane), Spokane Valley, and Post Falls.

Yoke's announced that it would acquire both Missoula Fresh Market (formerly Safeway) in Missoula. The switch will take place by early fall 2022.

History
Yoke's Fresh Market was founded in 1946 in Spokane, Washington, by Marshall and Harriet Yoke. 

In 1990, Chuck Yoke sold the chain of stores to the employees, thus forming an employee stock ownership plan.

Locations

Spokane, Washington locations
Airway Heights – 12825 W. Sunset Hwy.
Argonne – 9329 E. Montgomery Ave.
Cheney – 4 Cheney-Spokane Rd (formerly Trading Company)
Deer Park – 810 S. Main St.
Indian Trail – 3321 W. Indian Trail Rd.
Latah Creek – 4235 S. Cheney-Spokane Rd (west of US-195) (formerly Tidyman's and Trading Company)
Liberty Lake – 1233 N. Liberty Lake Rd. (formerly Safeway and Haggen)
Mead – 14202 N. Market St.
North Foothills – 210 E. North Foothills Dr.
Sprague & McDonald – 13014 E. Sprague Ave (formerly Tidyman's and Trading Company)
Sprague – 15111 E. Sprague Ave. Store was closed in late 2010.
Wellesley – 4507 W. Wellesley Ave. Store was closed in September 2007.

Washington: other locations
Kennewick, Washington – 1410 W. 27th Ave.
Pasco, Washington – 4905 Road 68
West Richland, Washington – 1401 Bombing Range Rd.
South Richland, Washington – 454 Keene Rd.

Idaho locations
Kellogg, Idaho – 117 N. Hill St.
Ponderay, Idaho – 212 Bonner Mall Way
Post Falls, Idaho – 1501 E. Seltice Way (formerly Tidyman's and Trading Company)

Montana locations
Missoula, Montana - 3801 S. Reserve St (opened in fall 2022) (formerly Safeway and Missoula Fresh Market)
Missoula, Montana - 800 W. Broadway Ave (opened in fall 2022) (formerly Safeway and Missoula Fresh Market)

References

External links
Yoke's Fresh Market

Employee-owned companies of the United States
Supermarkets of the United States
American companies established in 1946
Retail companies established in 1946
Companies based in Spokane, Washington
1946 establishments in Washington (state)